Naciria is a district in Boumerdès Province, Algeria. It was named after its capital, Naciria.

Municipalities
The district is further divided into 2 municipalities:
Naciria
Ouled Aissa

The historic name of Naciria is Laaziv zaamoum, situated in the state of Boumerdes (Algeria).

History

French conquest

 Expedition of the Col des Beni Aïcha (1837)
 First Battle of the Issers (1837)
 Battle of the Col des Beni Aïcha (1871)

Algerian Revolution

Salafist terrorism

 2008 Naciria bombing (2 January 2008)

Notable people

 Mohamed ben Zamoum
 Omar ben Zamoum

References

Districts of Boumerdès Province